Dennis Allene Bradshaw (born August 14, 1936) is an American former tennis player.

A native of San Diego, Bradshaw won the singles title at the Delaware Grass Court Championships in 1954.

Bradshaw has the unusual distinction of reaching the quarter-finals the only time she appeared in a grand slam tournament, at the 1954 U.S. National Championships. Following a walkover win over fourth-seed Margaret duPont in the third round, she lost her final eight match to Darlene Hard in three sets.

In 1955 she represented the United States at the Pan American Games in Mexico.

References

1936 births
Living people
American female tennis players
Tennis players at the 1955 Pan American Games
Pan American Games competitors for the United States
Tennis players from San Diego